The Ecologist Greens (LVE) was a green political party in Spain, founded on 14 May 1986 as Green Future. In November 1987 it adopted its name of The Ecologist Greens, and from July 1991 the party was re-named as The Ecologists.

References

1986 establishments in Spain
1994 disestablishments in Spain
Defunct political parties in Spain
Green political parties in Spain
Humanism
Political parties disestablished in 1996
Political parties established in 1986